Lemonsoda is a brand of Italian carbonated soft drinks created in the 1940s by Milan-based company Saga and currently owned by Royal Unibrew.

History 
The original Lemonsoda flavor was lemon. Oransoda and Pelmosoda, orange and grapefruit-flavored sodas, were introduced in the following years. In 1980 the brand was sold to Crodo, which became part of the Campari Group in 1999. During the 2003/2004 season Lemonsoda was the official sponsor of Lecce football club. In 2005, a tonic water titled Tonicsoda was the first Lemonsoda product born under the Campari brand. In 2010, two new versions of traditional Lemonsoda were created: sugarless Lemonsoda Zero and the Mojitosoda, a non-alcoholic cocktail made with lemon juice and mint flavor, flavored like a mojito cocktail. In October 2017, the Lemonsoda brand was sold to Royal Unibrew for 80 million Euro.

See also

 List of lemonade topics

References

External links
 Lemonsoda in Österreich by Günter Kenesei Sportmanagement

Italian drinks
Lemonade
Campari Group
Royal Unibrew subsidiaries
Royal Unibrew brands